Heavy Light is the fifth studio album by Portuguese musical project Norton. It was announced on 22 January 2020 and three singles were already released ahead of the album, "Changes", "Passengers" and "1997".

It follows the 2014 album Norton, and will be released on vinyl, CD, cassette and digitally.

The album was due to be released on 27 March 2020, but on 17 March the band announced the album release date would be postponed due to the ongoing coronavirus pandemic.

'Heavy Light' was released on 3 July 2020, on vinyl, cd, cassette and digital

Track listing

See also
 List of 2020 albums

References

2020 albums
Norton (band) albums